The Andarax—also, in its lower reaches, Almería River or River Almería—is a river in the province of Almería, Andalusia, Spain. It arises in the easternmost part of the Sierra Nevada. Its entire course is within the province of Almería. It flows through the Valley of Andarax south of the Sierra Nevada, running eastwards, and joins the River Nacimiento at the village of Terque.

It then turns southwards and passes through the Tabernas Desert, where it receives the intermittent waters of the Rambla de Tabernas, its last significant tributary. It passes through the municipalities of Rioja, Pechina, Viator, and Benahadux, where it waters many citrus orchards. Finally, it reaches the sea on the outskirts of the city of Almería, forming a wide delta.

Notes

Rivers of Spain
Rivers of Andalusia
Geography of the Province of Almería